Plautius Quintillus (died by 175) was a Roman senator who lived in the 2nd century.

Life
The family of Plautius Quintillus was of consular rank and was politically active during the Nerva–Antonine dynasty in the 2nd century. Quintillus’ birth name could have been Lucius Titius Plautius Quintillus. His father was probably Lucius Titius Epidius Aquilinus, who served as consul in 125 under the Emperor Hadrian. According to a preserved incomplete inscription found in Rome, Aquilinus may have been the head of a priestly college and could have hosted a public entertainment event held in Rome. His brother may have been Lucius Titius Plautius Aquilinus, who served as consul in 162 under the co-Emperors Marcus Aurelius and Lucius Verus. 

During the reign of Antoninus Pius (138-161), Quintillus served as an ordinary consul. Quintillus married a noblewoman called Ceionia Fabia, the daughter of Lucius Aelius Verus Caesar, the first adopted heir of Hadrian; she was Lucius Verus' sister, and, thus, sister-in-law to the Empress Lucilla. Fabia bore Quintillus a son called Marcus Peducaeus Plautius Quintillus, who later married Annia Aurelia Fadilla, one of the daughters of Marcus Aurelius and Faustina the Younger. 

Throughout the former Roman Empire, various honorific inscriptions dedicated to Quintillus and his family have been found, mentioning him, his wife, his son and his relation to Lucius Verus.

Sources
 Albino Garzetti, From Tiberius to the Antonines: a history of the Roman Empire AD 14-192 (1974)
 Alan K. Bowman, Peter Garnsey, Dominic Rathbone, The Cambridge ancient history, Volume 11 second edition (2000)
 Anthony Richard Birley, Marcus Aurelius, (London: Routledge, 2000)

Imperial Roman consuls
2nd-century Romans
2nd-century deaths
Year of birth unknown
Plautii
Titii
Nerva–Antonine dynasty